Gabon Express Flight 221 was a scheduled domestic passenger flight which crashed into the Atlantic Ocean on 8 June 2004. The Hawker Siddeley HS 748 was carrying 26 passengers and 4 crew and was flying from Gabon's capital Libreville to Franceville via Port-Gentil when an engine failed. The crew tried to return to Libreville International Airport; however they overflew it and nosedived into the sea. At least 19 people were killed in the crash. It was the second deadliest plane crash in Gabon. Gabon President Omar Bongo declared three days of national mourning in response to the disaster.

Flight
Flight 221 was a regular domestic passenger service operated by a Gabonese airline, Gabon Express. At the time the airline was the second largest airline in Gabon, with over 60 destinations. The flight was carrying 26 passengers and 4 crew. Among the passengers were 7 French nationals, 2 Lebanese and a German. Shortly after takeoff from Libreville the crew reported problems with the aircraft. A failure of the oil pressure on the No.2 engine occurred, causing the crew to turn back.

While returning the crew tried to extend the aircraft's landing gear, however it did not do so, due to problems with the hydraulics. Witnesses on the ground stated that the aircraft was operating with only one engine.  Flight 221 then nose-dived into the sea . 

The tail and the front part of the aircraft separated from the main body. As the aircraft was not fully submerged, several survivors managed to escape from the sinking wreckage. 4 hours after the initial impact, the wreckage sank and fully submerged , with many people still trapped inside the wreckage.

Search and rescue
Immediately after the crash, fire crew and emergency services were deployed. 11 survivors were evacuated from the scene and were taken by helicopters to local hospital in Libreville; none had received serious injuries. Divers were deployed by authorities to rescue people trapped inside the wreckage. Local fishermen, French Navy and French military also joined the rescue effort.

Aftermath
As the crash of Flight 221 claimed 19 lives, the President of Gabon, Omar Bongo, declared three days of national mourning in honor to the victims of the crash. A government official stated that a national funeral will be held in response to the crash.

References

2004 disasters in Africa
Aviation accidents and incidents in 2004
Aviation accidents and incidents in Gabon
Accidents and incidents involving the Hawker Siddeley HS 748
Marine salvage operations
June 2004 events in Africa
2004 in Gabon